Here is the second album from Edward Sharpe and the Magnetic Zeros. It was preceded by Up from Below. Recorded at Adios Studios, a.k.a. the Ed Shed in Ojai, California 
and at Studio in the Country in Louisiana, it was released on May 29, 2012 by Vagrant Records and Rough Trade Records. It received mostly positive reviews, ranking #7 on Rolling Stone's Best Albums of 2012 list, saying "Frontman Alex Ebert sings earnestly about love and spirituality, letting his mind wander pleasantly over the band's homespun harmonies and easy-going folk-psych instrumentation."

Track listing

Personnel
Alex Ebert - vocals, guitars, percussion, organ, string arrangements
Jade Castrinos - vocals
Stewart Cole - piano, organ, synths, wurlitzer, pump organ, trumpet, alto horn, baritone horn, trombone, omnichord, vocals
Josh Collazo - drums, vocals
Seth Ford-Young - electric and acoustic bass, electric guitar, vocals
Nora Kirkpatrick - accordion, organ, synth, vocals
Christian Letts - acoustic guitar, electric guitar, vocals
Orpheo McCord - drums, percussion, marimba, drum machines, didgeridoo, vocals

With:
Mark Noseworthy - electric guitar, acoustic guitar, 11 string guitar, charango, ronrocco, banjo, vocals
Aaron Arntz - piano, clavinet
Aaron Embry - piano, harmonica
Nico Algietti - guitars
Aaron Older - bass
Nathaniel Markman - fiddle, viola
George Castrinos - slide guitar on "Fiya Wata"
 Matt Linesch - Engineer/Mixing Engineer

Commercial performance
Here debuted at No. 5 on the Billboard 200, with 35,000 copies sold in its first week. Up from Below, their debut album, peaked at No. 76. As of July 4, 2013 the album has sold 119,000 copies in United States.

Charts

References

External links
 
 Town of Songs
 First Listen: Edward Sharpe and the Magnetic Zeroes on NPR
 Alexander Ebert Interview with Spin Magazine
 

2012 albums
Edward Sharpe and the Magnetic Zeros albums
Rough Trade Records albums
Vagrant Records albums
Albums recorded at Studio in the Country